Cham Zeytun-e Eslamabad (also Romanized as Cham Zeytūn-e Eslāmābād; also known as Cham-e Zeytūn and Cham Zeytūn) is a village in Javid-e Mahuri Rural District, in the Central District of Mamasani County, Fars Province, Iran. At the 2006 census, its population was 37, in 7 families.

References 

Populated places in Mamasani County